Popular Unity Party was a political party in Portugal. PUP was founded in December 1974 by the Mendes fraction of the Communist Party of Portugal (Marxist-Leninist).

The PUP published a newspaper called Averdade (The Truth). It rejected parliamentary democracy and sought to create a people's republic of poor workers and peasants.

After the 1975 elections PUP was renamed Portuguese Marxist-Leninist Committee (Comité Marxista-Leninista Português).

In 1976 CMLP merged with the Portuguese Marxist-Leninist Communist Organization and the Organization for the Reconstruction of the Communist Party (Marxist-Leninist) to form the Portuguese Communist Party (Reconstructed).

References

Defunct communist parties in Portugal
Political parties established in 1974
Political parties disestablished in 1976
1974 establishments in Portugal
1976 disestablishments in Portugal